KKWN (106.7 FM) is a radio station broadcasting a talk radio format. Licensed to Cashmere, Washington, United States, the station serves the Wenatchee, Washington, area. The station is currently owned by Townsquare Media and licensed to Townsquare License, LLC.

The station was assigned the KZPH call letters by the Federal Communications Commission on February 1, 1991. The station changed its call sign to KWWX on January 23, 2008, and to the current KKWN on August 10, 2015.  It broadcasts an all news/talk format which is simulcasted on 1370 AM KWNC located in  Quincy.

Ownership
In June 2006, a deal was reached for the then-KZPH to be acquired by Cherry Creek Media from Fisher Radio Regional Group as part of a 24-station deal with a total reported sale price of $33.3 million.

Previous logo

References

External links

KWN
Townsquare Media radio stations